Magnus (died 475 AD) was a Roman senator of Narbonne (then Narbo). He was appointed Roman consul in 460 by the Western emperor Majorian, at the same time Apollonius served in the East. Magnus also served as praetorian prefect of Gaul around the same time.

Family
Magnus was the grandson of Agricola, consul in 421 and father of Emperor Avitus. According to one reconstruction, his father might have been the son of Ennodius, proconsul of Africa. He might have been Felix, consul in 428, who married Padusia and was allegedly an ancestor of Felix, consul in 511.

He was the father of:
 Magnus Felix, praetorian prefect of Gaul in 469, married to Attica;
 Araneola, married to Polemius between 460 and 469.
 Probus, a Roman senator

Sources and references

 

Sidonius Apollinaris, The Letters of Sidonius (Oxford: Clarendon, 1915), pp. clx-clxxxiii

390 births
475 deaths
5th-century Gallo-Roman people
5th-century Roman consuls
Imperial Roman consuls
Praetorian prefects of Gaul
Senators of the Roman Empire
Year of death unknown
Date of death unknown